Cogshall may refer to:

1764 Cogshall, an asteroid which was discovered by the Indiana Asteroid Program
Cogshall Hall, a country house near the village of Comberbach, Cheshire, England
Cogshall (mango), a mango cultivar that originated in southwest Florida